KYSS-FM (94.9 MHz) is a commercial radio station in Missoula, Montana, airing a country music format. The station is also one of two Country outlets in Missoula competing for listeners, the other being KGGL. Despite the "KISS" sounding call letters and it having once been owned by Clear Channel Communications, it has no relation to the Top 40 branding. It also shares the same Buck Owens-trademarked red, white & blue guitar logo as KNIX-FM/Phoenix, Arizona.

History

KYSS-FM came to air May 11, 1969. It was owned by the Garden City Broadcasting Corporation alongside KYSS (930 AM, now KMPT) and broadcast a beautiful music format on 100.1 MHz. In 1973, the FCC approved a major power increase for KYSS to 100,000 watts at 94.9 FM. The format changed to country, which it currently airs today.

In October 2007, a deal was reached for KYSS to be acquired by GAP Broadcasting II LLC (Samuel Weller, president) from Clear Channel Communications as part of a 57 station deal with a total reported sale price of $74.78 million. What eventually became GapWest Broadcasting was folded into Townsquare Media on August 13, 2010.

References

External links
Official Website
Flash Stream, MP3 Stream

FCC History Cards for KYSS-FM

Country radio stations in the United States
YSS-FM
Radio stations established in 1969
Townsquare Media radio stations